Clerodendrum quadriloculare (known as the bronze-leaved clerodendrum, fireworks plant, Philippine glorybower, shooting star or starburst bush in English, and  or  in Filipino) is a species of flowering plant native to New Guinea and the Philippines. It is one of many species previously included in the family Verbenaceae, but transferred to the Lamiaceae based on molecular studies. The plants produce flowers which look good in a garden, but it can be difficult to eradicate.

Description
The branches and twigs are four-sided. The leaves are in opposite pairs and are borne on medium-length petioles. The showy flower clusters are borne at the tips of the shoots. The flowers are followed by ellipsoid, capsules containing four seeds. The corolla tubes are exceptionally long and require specialist pollinators.

Distribution and habitat
The bronze-leaved clerodendrum is native to the Philippines and Papua New Guinea, and has also been recorded from American Samoa, the Federated States of Micronesia, Fiji, French Polynesia, Guam, the Marshall Islands, the Northern Mariana Islands, Palau and Samoa, as well as Puerto Rico, Singapore, and Hawaii. As well as parks and gardens, it is found on road verges and on disturbed ground, pastures, forest edges and undisturbed forests where it is able to displace native species.

Invasiveness
The bronze-leaved clerodendrum is grown as an ornamental shrub but it has become naturalised in many locations, in some of which it is viewed as an invasive species. It is a vigorous, rapid-growing shrub which sends up suckers which may develop into thickets. Additionally, cuttings and pieces of detached roots are easily moved with soil and can develop into new plants, and the seeds, which germinate readily, are spread by animals and birds in their droppings. This shrub can grow in full sun, partial shade and deep shade, and in some locations grows as a dense, mono-specific ground cover layer under the forest canopy.

References

External links

quadriloculare
Flora of the Philippines
Flora of New Guinea
Garden plants
Plants described in 1837
Taxa named by Francisco Manuel Blanco